George W. F. Hallgarten, or Georg(e) Wolfgang Felix Hallgarten (January 3, 1901, München – May 22, 1975, Washington, DC), was a German-born American historian.

Hallgarten was a student of Max Weber in the University of Munich for a short time. In 1925 he became Dr. phil. in Munich, taught by Hermann Oncken and Karl Alexander von Müller. In 1933, he moved to Paris to flee the Nazis, mainly due to his Marxist approach and his pacifist conviction, as his mother was the German pacifist Constanze Hallgarten.

Hallgarten's grandfather Charles Hallgarten had U.S. citizenship already, but G. W. F. Hallgarten had to re-naturalize as an American in 1942. Afterwards, he took part in the U.S. war effort during World War II, working for the psychological warfare division (PWD).

When World War II ended, Hallgarten returned to the US, working as a historian, initially for the U.S. Army. When the Cold War evolved, he refused to work for the Army and resigned. He was a guest professor several times: in the U.S., in Germany, Japan (1965), India (1965) and Italy (1967), without a tenured professorship until 1972. Then he became Robert Lee Bailey professor at the University of North Carolina in Charlotte.

Literary works 
 Imperialismus vor 1914, 1951 
 "帝国主義と現代", 1967 
 Why dictators?, 1967
 Das Wettrüsten, 1967 
 Hitler, Reichswehr, Industrie, 1955 
 Als die Schatten fielen, 1969 , (self biography)
 Deutsche Industrie und Politik, 1974 , (collaboration with J. Radkau)

External links
 Register of the George Wolfgang Felix Hallgarten Papers, 1874-1975, Online Archive of California.

20th-century German historians
1901 births
1975 deaths
20th-century American historians
German male non-fiction writers
German emigrants to the United States
20th-century American male writers
American male non-fiction writers